"Weatherman" is the debut single by the Irish band Juniper, the precursor to Bell X1 and Damien Rice. It was released on 30 January 1998 and spent seven weeks in the Irish Singles Chart after entering on 5 February, breaking into the Top 10 and achieving a peak of ninth position.

"Weatherman" was released on the Mercury Records label. It featured two B-sides, "Little Sister" and "Rage", the latter of which was recorded at Sulan Studios in Ballyvourney, County Cork and the former of which was recorded at Windmill Lane Studios in Dublin along with "Weatherman". It also featured as the sixth track in a ten-track compilation given away by Hot Press to promote the Heineken Green Energy festival that year.

PolyGram signed a six-album deal with the band around this time.

Track listing 
CDS 469344/2
 "Weatherman" - (3:51)
 "Little Sister" - (3:25)
 "Rage" - (3:18)

Chart performance

References

External links 
 Juniper discography at Irish Music Central

1998 singles
Juniper (band) songs
1998 songs
Mercury Records singles
Songs written by Damien Rice
Songs written by Paul Noonan
Songs written by Brian Crosby (composer)
Songs written by David Geraghty